is a maxi single released by the J-pop singer, Mell. This was scheduled to be released on July 29, 2009. This single has also been contained in the I've Sound 10th Anniversary 「Departed to the future」 Special CD BOX which was released on March 25, 2009.

The coupling song Utsukushiku Ikitai: I've in Budokan 2009 Live Ver. is the live version of her first visual novel theme song with I've Sound that she performed in their concert in Budokan last January 2, 2009.

The single will only come in a limited CD+DVD edition (GNCV-0020). The DVD will contain the Promotional Video for Kara no Tsubomi.

Track listing 
—6:01
Lyrics: Mell
Composition: C.G mix
Arrangement: C.G mix, Takeshi Hoshino
Utsukushii Ikitai: I've in Budokan 2009 Live Ver. -- 5:37
Lyrics/Composition/Arrangement: Kazuya Takase
—6:00

I've Sound 10th Anniversary 「Departed to the future」 Special CD BOX sales trajectory

Sales trajectory

References

2009 singles
Mell songs
Song recordings produced by I've Sound
2009 songs